Actinella laciniosa is a species of air-breathing land snail, a terrestrial pulmonate gastropod mollusk in the family Geometridae. This species is endemic to Madeira, Portugal.

References

Molluscs of Madeira
Endemic fauna of Madeira
Actinella
Gastropods described in 1852
Taxonomy articles created by Polbot